Kevin "Clyde" Sefton (born 20 January 1951) is a former road racing cyclist from Australia, who was a professional rider from 1972 to 1983. He represented his native country at the 1972 Summer Olympics in Munich, West Germany, where he won the silver medal in the men's individual road race, behind the Netherlands' Hennie Kuiper. He also competed at the 1976 Summer Olympics.

He won the Australian national road race title in 1981.

Major results

1972
2nd  Road race, Olympic Games
1974
Giro Ciclistico d'Italia
1st Stages 6 & 10b
1978
Herald Sun Tour
1st Stages 3a & 7a
2nd Gran Piemonte
2nd Giro di Romagna
10th Milan-San Remo
1979
1st Stage 6 Herald Sun Tour
6th Giro dell'Emilia
1981
1st  Overall Herald Sun Tour
1st Stages 10, 12 & 21
1st  Road race, National Road Championships
1982
2nd Overall Herald Sun Tour
1st Stages 4a & 8
1983
Herald Sun Tour
1st Stages 1, 7 & 17

References

External links

1951 births
Living people
Australian male cyclists
Cyclists at the 1972 Summer Olympics
Cyclists at the 1976 Summer Olympics
Olympic cyclists of Australia
Olympic silver medalists for Australia
Cyclists from Victoria (Australia)
Commonwealth Games gold medallists for Australia
Olympic medalists in cycling
Medalists at the 1972 Summer Olympics
Commonwealth Games medallists in cycling
Cyclists at the 1974 British Commonwealth Games
Medallists at the 1974 British Commonwealth Games